Sığacık is a seaside neighborhood of Seferihisar ilçe (district) of İzmir Province, Turkey. It is situated on a small peninsula, facing north. The harbor is in the east side of and the beaches are in the west side. Its population is 3637

Sığacık is next to the ancient Ionian city of Teos. An Ottoman castle (now in ruins) built in 1522  is also in Sığacık. Up to 2009 Sığacık was a fishermen's village. But after Seferihisar became a city of Cittaslow, Sığacık gained fame as a town of quiet holiday resort.

Gallery

References

Seaside resorts in Turkey
Populated coastal places in Turkey
Seferihisar
Tourist attractions in İzmir Province